Dussia foxii is a species of flowering plant in the family Fabaceae. It is found only in Peru.

References

Amburaneae
Flora of Peru
Vulnerable plants
Taxonomy articles created by Polbot